The 2020-21 Federation Cup (due to sponsorship from Walton also known as Walton Federation Cup 2020) was the 32nd edition of the tournament, the main domestic annual club football competition in Bangladesh organized by Bangladesh Football Federation. The 13 participants is competing in the tournament. The tournament has started on 22 December 2020.The winner of the tournament will earn the slot of playing Qualifying play-off of 2022 AFC Cup.

Bashundhara Kings are current champions. The club have defeated Rahmatganj MFS by 2–1 on 5 January  2020 to lift the trophy for the first time.

Venue

Participating teams
The following teams contest in the tournament.

Draw
The draw ceremony of the tournament was held on 13 December 2020 at 12:00 BST on the 3rd floor of BFF House Motijheel, Dhaka. The thirteen teams were divided into four groups. The top two teams from each group will move into the Quarter-Finals.

Group stage
All matches will be held at Dhaka
Time listed are UTC+6:00

Group A

Group B

Group C

Group D

Knockout-stage
 All matches will play at Dhaka
Times listed are UTC+6:00
In the knockout stage, extra-time and a penalty shoot-out will used to decide the winner if necessary.

Bracket

Quarter-finals

Semi-finals

Final

Goalscorers

Own goals 
† Bold Club indicates winner of the match

Broadcaster
The private satellite TV channel T Sports has broadcast all matches live.

References

Bangladesh Federation Cup
2020 in Bangladeshi football
1
2020–21 Asian domestic association football cups